Great Big Hits Live! Bootleg is an album by American rock band Poison, released on July 4, 2006 by Sony.

The album consists of 10 live tracks from Poison's successful 1999-2000 Comeback tour. All the songs but three are Poison singles that charted on The Billboard Hot 100 including the number 1 hit "Every Rose Has Its Thorn".

Power to the People
The record is essentially Power to the People re-packaged without the new studio tracks and the guitar and drum solos (live songs only). Power to the People was released in 2000 and charted at #166 on The Billboard 200 and #16 on the Australian ARIA Charts, selling more than 1.5 million copies to date reaching US Gold status.

Track listing 
Look What the Cat Dragged In (3:56)
I Want Action (3:36)
Something to Believe In (6:34) 
Love on the Rocks (3:32)
Fallen Angel (4:24)
Let It Play (4:03)
Every Rose Has Its Thorn (4:44)
Unskinny Bop (3:58)
Nothin' But a Good Time (4:22)
Talk Dirty to Me (3:56)

References

External links
Official website

Poison (American band) live albums
2006 live albums